The Greater London Authority (Referendum) Act 1998 (c. 3) is an Act of the Parliament of the United Kingdom, which made legal provision for the holding of a non-binding referendum in Greater London on whether there should be a democratically elected Assembly for London and a separately elected Mayor for London.

The Act
The Act legislated for the holding of a non-binding referendum to be held on 7 May 1998 in Greater London on whether there should be a democratically elected London Assembly and a separately elected Mayor for London and legislates for the appointment a Chief Counting Officer to oversee the referendum.

The referendum
The act legislated for a non binding referendum to be held in Greater London on 7 May 1998 on the issue of a Greater London Authority and enables the Deputy Prime Minister of the United Kingdom to appoint a Chief Counting Officer to oversee the referendum.

Referendum question

The question that appeared on ballot papers in the referendum before the electorate under the act was:

permitting a simple YES / NO answer.

Counting areas
The 33 London Boroughs would be used as the counting areas for the referendum.

Result

Outcome
Following the successful outcome of the vote the Greater London Authority Act 1999 was passed by the UK Parliament and the  Authority came into being following elections in 2000.

See also
Referendums in the United Kingdom

References

United Kingdom Acts of Parliament 1998
Referendums in England
Acts of the Parliament of the United Kingdom concerning London